Jack Perrin (born Lyman Wakefield Perrin; July 25, 1896 – December 17, 1967) was an American actor specializing in Westerns.

Early life
Perrin was born in Three Rivers, Michigan. His father worked in real estate and relocated the family to Los Angeles, California shortly after the start of the 20th century.

Career 
Perrin served in the United States Navy during World War I. Following the war, he returned to Los Angeles and started acting for Universal Studios. His first on-screen appearance was in the 1917 film Luke's Lost Liberty alongside Harold Lloyd. During the 1920s, Perrin made a name for himself, starring in a number of cliffhanger, melodrama, and serial films. Perrin found a niche in B-movie Westerns of the 1930s. He usually played leads as Jack Perrin, but occasionally adopted the pseudonyms Jack Gable or Richard (Dick) Terry. 

In 1960 Perrin appeared (uncredited) as Barfly on Cheyenne in the episode titled "Alibi for the Scalped Man."  In 1961 Perrin appeared (uncredited) as a Courtroom Spectator on the TV western Lawman in the episode titled "Detweiler's Kid." That same year he also appeared (uncredited) as Barfly on Lawman in the episode titled "Owny O'Reilly" and also (uncredited) as a Townsman on Bat Masterson in the episode titled "Episode In Eden."

Perrin's last major role was as Davy Crockett in 1937's The Painted Stallion, for Republic Pictures. Though he continued making films through 1960, many of his later roles were minor and often went un-credited. 

For his contributions as an actor in motion pictures, Jack Perrin was awarded a star on the Hollywood Walk of Fame at 1777 Vine Street, in Hollywood, California.

Family 
Perrin married silent film actress Josephine Hill in 1920 and the two divorced in 1937.

Death 
Perrin suffered a heart attack and died December 17, 1967, aged 71.

Selected filmography

Luke's Lost Liberty (1917)
Lonesome Luke's Lively Life (1917)
The Lion Man (1919)
The Jack of Hearts (1919)
The Four-Bit Man (1919)
The Fighting Heart (1919)
Blind Husbands (1919)
Pink Tights (1920)
 Lahoma (1920)
The Adorable Savage (1920)
The Match-Breaker (1921)
 Partners of the Tide (1921)
 The Torrent (1921)
The Rage of Paris (1921)
The Trouper (1922)
Mary of the Movies (1923)
The Santa Fe Trail (1923)
The Fighting Skipper (1923)
Those who Dance (1924)
Riders of the Plains (1924)
 Virginian Outcast (1924)
 Why Get Married? (1924)
Mistaken Orders (1925)
 Winning a Woman (1925)
 The Knockout Kid (1925)
Dangerous Traffic (1926)
 The Grey Devil (1926)
 The Man from Oklahoma (1926)
Midnight Faces (1926)
 Thunderbolt's Tracks (1927)
 Fire and Steel (1927)
The Vanishing West (1928)
 Wild Blood (1928)
The Water Hole (1928)
 Two Outlaws (1928)
Vultures of the Sea (1928)
 Overland Bound (1929)
The Harvest of Hate (1929)
 Plunging Hoofs (1929)
The Jade Box (1930)
 Romance of the West (1930)
 Beyond the Rio Grande (1930)
The Apache Kid's Escape (1930)
 The Phantom of the Desert (1930)
 Lariats and Six-Shooters (1931)
 Wild West Whoopee (1931)
 Trails of Danger (1931)
 The Sheriff's Secret (1931)
 Two-Gun Caballero (1931)
 The Kid from Arizona (1931)
 45 Calibre Echo (1932)
The Jaws of Justice (1933)
 Rawhide Mail (1934)
Mystery Ranch (1934)
Loser's End (1935)
North of Arizona (1935)
Wildcat Saunders (1936)
 Desert Justice (1936)
Reckless Ranger (1937)
The Purple Vigilantes (1938)
The Painted Stallion (1938)
The Pal from Texas (1939)
 West of Pinto Basin (1940)
Under Age (1941)

References

External links 

 
 

American male film actors
American male silent film actors
Male Western (genre) film actors
Male film serial actors
United States Navy personnel of World War I
United States Navy sailors
Male actors from Michigan
20th-century American male actors
1896 births
1967 deaths
Burials at Forest Lawn Memorial Park (Hollywood Hills)
People from Three Rivers, Michigan